Manu is a village in Dhalai, Tripura, India. It falls under Tripura East Lok Sabha Constituency.

Location
National Highway 108 ends at Manu. The nearest major town is Agartala, Tripura.

References

External links
 About Manu Ghat

Cities and towns in Dhalai district